Amos Azariah Jordan (February 11, 1922 – June 7, 2018) was an American  brigadier general in the United States Army and senior fellow at the Wheatley Institution of Brigham Young University.  He was formerly the CEO of the Center for Strategic and International Studies as well as a professor at the United States Military Academy.

Biography 
He was born in Idaho and was a member of the Church of Jesus Christ of Latter-day Saints and resided in Bountiful, Utah. He died at age 96 on June 7, 2018.

Jordan received his bachelor's degree from the United States Military Academy (West Point), graduating in the class of 1946.  During his senior year at West Point, he served as the "First Captain" -- the Academy's senior ranking cadet.  He then was a Rhodes Scholar at the University of Oxford where he received both a bachelor's and master's degree. While at Oxford, Jordan was a member of the Oxford University basketball team. He received a Ph.D. in international affairs from Columbia University.  His doctoral dissertation was on foreign aid and South-east Asian defense.

Career 
Jordan served in the Army in Korea and also served out of Fort Benning.

Jordan served for over 20 years on the faculty of West Point.

At various times Jordan has served as deputy under secretary in both the United States department of defense and the US department of state.  He is also the lead author of the book American National Security.  He also wrote at least one book on issues related to Korea.

Family 
Jordan is the father of Judge Kent A. Jordan, David J. Jordan, who for a time was the US attorney for the district of Utah and who served as the President of the England London Mission of the Church of Jesus Christ of Latter-day Saints, and Keith L. Jordan, who served as a state legislator in Tennessee.

Notes

Sources
Deseret News, Jan. 11, 2010
bibliography from Allbooks
Wheatley Institution faculty bio
Bio of Jordan from West Point

1922 births
2018 deaths
People from Idaho
American Rhodes Scholars
Brigham Young University staff
Military personnel from Idaho
School of International and Public Affairs, Columbia University alumni
United States Army generals
United States Military Academy alumni
United States Military Academy faculty